Karin, is a village in the Ashtarak Municipality of the Aragatsotn Province of Armenia.

References

Populated places in Aragatsotn Province